Kinase suppressor of Ras 1 is an enzyme that in humans is encoded by the KSR1 gene.

References

Further reading

EC 2.7.11